Dream Children is a 1998 novel by A. N. Wilson.

Owing to his own early encounters, Oliver Gold, a distinguished philosopher, has decided he can only be happy with a child. Oliver, however, moves in with a widow in North London. He makes all the ladies around him fall in love with him, from the aging matriarch to a pair of lesbian lovers to a little girl named Bobs. Bobs is aged three when Oliver moves in and is aged ten by the end of the book.

Plot summary

Paedophilia is at the heart of the story. Oliver Gold's pure thoughts, and seemingly asexual life contrast with the reality of his desires and deeds. Oliver abuses Bobs over a long period.

1998 British novels
Novels by A. N. Wilson
British philosophical novels
Child sexual abuse in literature
Pedophilia in literature
W. W. Norton & Company books